Bowdon Junction is an unincorporated community in Carroll County, Georgia, United States. Bowdon Junction has a post office with ZIP code 30109, which opened on April 29, 1911.

References

Unincorporated communities in Carroll County, Georgia
Unincorporated communities in Georgia (U.S. state)